The Browns–Ravens rivalry is a National Football League (NFL) rivalry between the Cleveland Browns and the Baltimore Ravens. The rivalry began in 1999, with the resumption of the Browns' franchise, which was created as a result of the Cleveland Browns relocation controversy. The rivalry between the Browns and Ravens was more directed at former Browns owner Art Modell than the team itself, and has, by most Ravens fans, been simply considered a divisional game.

Additionally, this matchup is more bitter for Cleveland than other rivalries due to the fact that many of the draft picks from 1996 to 1998 were on the roster for the Ravens team that won Super Bowl XXXV in 2000. Had the Browns stayed in Cleveland, these teams (drafted by general manager and former Browns tight end Ozzie Newsome) might have given the Browns the title after a 36-year drought.

The two AFC North rivals have played twice annually since 1999 when they represented the bygone AFC Central Division.  The rivalry has been relatively one-sided; Baltimore holds an advantage of 35–13 against Cleveland.  The two teams have yet to meet in the playoffs.

History

1995–98: Modell moves the Browns to Baltimore 

On November 6, 1995, Cleveland Browns owner Art Modell announced in a press conference at Camden Yards, home of Major League Baseball's Baltimore Orioles, that he had signed an agreement to relocate the Browns to Baltimore in 1996 – a move which would return the NFL to that city for the first time since the Colts relocated to Indianapolis after the 1983 season. Modell chose to relocate the team to Baltimore because he felt the city of Cleveland did not have the funding nor political will to build a first-class stadium.  The very next day, on November 7, Cleveland voters overwhelmingly approved the tax issue that Model requested to be placed on the ballot to provide $175 million in tax dollars to refurbish the outmoded and declining Cleveland Municipal Stadium.

The City of Cleveland sued Modell and other entities in City of Cleveland v. Cleveland Browns, et al., Cuyahoga County Court of Common Pleas Case No. CV-95-297833, for breaching the Browns' lease, filing an injunction to keep the Browns in Cleveland until at least 1998. Several other lawsuits were filed by fans and ticket holders. The United States Congress even held hearings on the matter.  On the field, the Browns stumbled to finish 5–11 after the announcement, Virtually all of the team's sponsors pulled their support, leaving Cleveland Stadium devoid of advertising during the team's final weeks. The final game the team played at Cleveland Municipal Stadium was a 26–10 victory over the Cincinnati Bengals, the first and only win since the announcement of the relocation.

After extensive talks between the NFL, the Browns, and officials of the two cities, Cleveland accepted a legal settlement that would keep the Browns' legacy in Cleveland. On February 9, 1996, the NFL announced that the Browns would be 'deactivated' for three years, and that a new stadium would be built for a new Browns team, as either an expansion team or a team moved from another city, that would begin play in 1999. Modell would in turn then be granted a new franchise (the 31st NFL franchise), for Baltimore, retaining the current contracts of players and personnel. There would be a reactivated team for Cleveland, where the Browns' name, colors, history, records, awards, and archives would remain in Cleveland.

1999–2007 Browns rejoined the NFL 
The Browns returned to the NFL as an expansion team in 1999. The two teams first met on the field on September 26 at Baltimore's PSINet Stadium, a 17–10 Ravens win.

In 2000, the Ravens won Super Bowl XXXV, leaving a bitter taste for Browns fans. Some in the Ohio media believed that had the Browns not moved to Baltimore five years earlier, it would be the Browns claiming their first-ever Super Bowl title.

The Browns collected their first win of the rivalry on October 21, 2001.  The Browns' defense had seven sacks and three takeaways on their way to a 24–14 victory.  The Browns would complete the sweep of their rivals with a 27–17 win later that season.

On April 8, 2004, Modell sold the controlling interest of the Ravens to then-minority owner Steve Bisciotti. Despite relinquishing control of the Ravens, he was still hated in Cleveland, not only for relocating the Browns, but also for his firing of head coach Paul Brown in 1963. Some considered the Browns' relocation to have cost Modell a spot in the Pro Football Hall of Fame, which is located in Canton, Ohio, 60 miles south of Cleveland. Modell died in 2012, never returning to Cleveland after the move. The Browns were the only home team that did not commemorate Modell's death the following Sunday. The team opted not to do so at the request of David Modell, Art Modell's stepson, who feared that the announcement would be met with anger by Browns fans still upset about the move.

2008–2018 The Harbaugh/Flacco era 
Prior to the 2008 season, the Ravens hired John Harbaugh as head coach and drafted quarterback Joe Flacco in the first round.  These two had an immediate impact on the rivalry as the Ravens would win the next eleven meetings.  Overall, as of the 2020 season the Ravens are 21–4 against the Browns under Harbaugh.  During this time, the Browns have had six different head coaches.

The Ravens won their second Super Bowl in 2012.   This compounded the bitterness some Browns fans had about Modell's move to Baltimore, as it could have been the Browns winning their second Super Bowl.  However, there was far less outcry than in 2000 as Art Modell, who had died earlier that season, had sold the team years ago, and the only Browns-era holdover was GM Ozzie Newsome.

On October 11, 2015,  Browns tight end Gary Barnidge caught a contested throw from Josh McCown in between his legs after it bounced off his hands onto his posterior. The resulting touchdown, dubbed the "Butt Catch", helped the Browns beat the Ravens in overtime 33–30, marking their first win in Baltimore since 2007. This was Cleveland's last divisional victory until 2018 (see below).

The November 30, 2015 rematch on Monday Night Football was another close game, this time in favor of the Ravens. When the Browns were in position to win the game with a field goal in the closing seconds, Ravens defender Brent Urban blocked the kick, allowing teammate Will Hill to recover the ball and run it in for the game-winning touchdown. The game was noted for numerous Browns fans' reactions to their team's heartbreaking loss and has been considered one of the worst moments in Browns history.

2018–2021 Mayfield vs. Jackson 

After finishing the 2017 season 0–16, the Browns took 2017 Heisman Trophy winning quarterback Baker Mayfield from Oklahoma 1st overall in the 2018 NFL Draft. The Ravens took quarterback and 2016 Heisman Winner Lamar Jackson from Louisville in the same draft, #32 overall.

On October 7, 2018, the Browns defeated the Ravens with a strong defensive performance and 342 passing yards from Mayfield. In another overtime game, the Browns and Ravens traded possessions in the extra period until Mayfield drove Cleveland deep into Baltimore territory to set up the game-winning field goal by Greg Joseph. In week 17 of that season, the Ravens defeated the Browns 26–24 in Baltimore to clinch the AFC North title with Ravens linebacker C.J. Mosley intercepting a pass from Baker Mayfield with just over a minute left to seal the game. The Browns were denied their first winning season since 2007 in the defeat. This game was the first matchup between Mayfield and Jackson, the latter of whom did not become the Ravens' starter until week 11, replacing Joe Flacco.

The Browns won the first meeting of the 2019 season 40–25 behind strong play from Mayfield, running back Nick Chubb and the defense. The Ravens would win the second meeting of the 2019 season 31–15 in which Baltimore, who already won the AFC North crown earlier in the season, would earn homefield advantage throughout the AFC playoffs. With the Ravens win, the Browns were also eliminated from playoff contention and clinched a losing record for the 12th straight season despite being considered a Super Bowl contender by media pundits in the off-season. The teams met again to open the 2020 season in Baltimore in which the Ravens beat the Browns 38-6 off a strong performance from Jackson through the air (275 yards, 3 touchdowns and a passer rating of 152.1).

The highest scoring game in the history of the rivalry came on Monday Night Football December 14, 2020 where both teams combined for nine touchdowns and 89 points. The Ravens won 47–42.

2022–present 
In the 2022 offseason, after the Browns traded for Texans quarterback Deshaun Watson and signed him to a contract extension, Mayfield requested that the team trade him, and sure enough, on July 6, 2022, Mayfield was traded to the Carolina Panthers for a 2024 conditional fifth-round draft pick, while Jackson stayed with the Ravens and turned down a contract extension due to his belief that he could improve and earn more. The two teams are set to meet again during the regular season on October 23, 2022 at M&T Bank Stadium in Baltimore, Maryland.

Notable people connected to rivalry
 Art Modell - Modell angered many Clevelanders when he moved the Browns, but he won the hearts of Baltimore fans almost instantly by bringing the NFL back to that city 12 years after then Baltimore Colts owner Robert Irsay packed his team and left for Indianapolis in moving vans in 1984. Although still vilified by ardent Browns fans to this day, he still was instrumental in helping his friend, then MBNA corporate president and minority investor Al Lerner, secure the purchase rights of what became the new expansion Browns franchise in 1999 in spring of 1996.
 Ozzie Newsome - The legendary Pro Football Hall of Fame tight end, who played for the Browns from 1978 to 1990, has been a guru in evaluating talent since he followed Modell, who hired him in the Browns' front office in 1992, to Baltimore as the team's new director of player personnel, and then as the team's new GM in 2002, either helping the team draft or drafting such standout players as Hall of Fame players Ray Lewis, Jamal Lewis and Jonathan Ogden and QB Joe Flacco, and trading for or signing standout players such as Steve Smith, Sr. and Priest Holmes, which has, much to the chagrin of Browns' fans, greatly contributed to the Ravens' dominance over Newsome's former team.
 Jamal Lewis - Played for the Ravens for six of his nine NFL seasons, where he regularly torched the Browns defenses, before he signed with the Browns in 2007.  Lewis made the Pro Bowl in 2003 after rushing for 2,066 yards; in total, he rushed for 1,000 yards or more 5 of the six years there. In 2007, he was still efficient in rushing for 1,304 yards for the Browns, as he would follow that season up with rush totals of 1,002 yards in 2008 and 500 in 2009 before retiring as a Brown.
 Phil Savage - Began his administrative career with the Browns, as part of the team's scouting department in 1993 with Newsome, before joining him and other Browns personnel to become part of the Ravens' scouting department when the team moved to Baltimore. He then assumed the title of director of player personnel in 2003 for the Ravens. After leaving that job to assume the role of Senior VP and GM in Cleveland in 2005, he was let go in 2008 after a disappointing, injury-filled  4–12 season, with then-head coach Romeo Crennel. This was after the team posted a 10–6 season where they beat the Ravens twice that year.
 Billy Cundiff - Placekicker who played for both the Browns and Ravens. His time with the Ravens was marred by one of the most infamous missed field goals in recent NFL history, which cost Baltimore a chance to beat the New England Patriots and advance to the Super Bowl.

Season-by-season results 

|-
| 
| style="| Ravens 2–0
| style="| Ravens  17–10
| style="| Ravens  41–9
| Ravens  2–0
| Browns return to the NFL.  First meetings between  Art Modell and his former team
|-

|-
| 
| style="| Ravens 2–0
| style="| Ravens  44–7
| style="| Ravens  12–0
| Ravens  4–0
| Ravens win Super Bowl XXXV
|-
| 
| style="| Browns 2–0
| style="| Browns  27–17
| style="| Browns  24–14
| Ravens  4–2
| Browns record first ever wins over Ravens. 
|-
| 
| Tie 1–1
| style="| Browns  14–13
| style="| Ravens  26–21
| Ravens  5–3
| 
|-
| 
| style="| Ravens 2–0
| style="| Ravens  33–13
| style="| Ravens  35–0
| Ravens  7–3
| 
|-
| 
| Tie 1–1
| style="| Ravens  27–13
| style="| Browns  20–3
| Ravens  8–4
|
|-
| 
| Tie 1–1
| style="| Ravens  16–3
| style="| Browns  20–16
| Ravens  9–5
|
|-
| 
| style="| Ravens 2–0
| style="| Ravens  27–17
| style="| Ravens  15–14
| Ravens  11–5
| 
|-
| 
| style="| Browns 2–0
| style="| Browns  33–30(OT)
| style="| Browns  27–13
| Ravens  11–7
|Browns win game in Baltimore in "Phil Dawson game", also their most recent season sweep of the Ravens
|-
| 
| style="| Ravens 2–0
| style="| Ravens  28–10
| style="| Ravens  37–27
| Ravens  13–7
| Ravens hire head coach John Harbaugh, draft QB Joe Flacco
|-
| 
| style="| Ravens 2–0
| style="| Ravens  34–3
| style="| Ravens  16–0
| Ravens  15–7
| 
|-

|-
| 
| style="| Ravens 2–0
| style="| Ravens  24–17
| style="| Ravens  26–10
| Ravens  17–7
| 
|-
| 
| style="| Ravens 2–0
| style="| Ravens  20–14
| style="| Ravens  24–10
| Ravens  19–7
| 
|-
| 
| style="| Ravens 2–0
| style="| Ravens  23–16
| style="| Ravens  25–15
| Ravens  21–7
| Ravens win Super Bowl XLVII
|-
| 
| Tie 1–1
| style="| Ravens  14–6
| style="| Browns  24–18
| Ravens  22–8
| Ravens lose first game to Browns under Harbaugh/Flacco (they had been 11–0)
|-
| 
| style="| Ravens 2–0
| style="| Ravens  20–10
| style="| Ravens  23–21
| Ravens  24–8
| Ravens clinch playoff spot title in final game of the season in Baltimore
|-
| 
| Tie 1–1
| style="| Browns  33–30 (OT)
| style="| Ravens  33–27
| Ravens  25–9
| Ravens win game in Cleveland on a Will Hill touchdown return after a blocked field goal that would have won the game for the Browns 
|-
| 
| style="| Ravens 2–0
| style="| Ravens  28–7
| style="| Ravens  25–20
| Ravens  27–9
| 
|-
| 
| style="| Ravens 2–0
| style="| Ravens  24–10
| style="| Ravens  27–10
| Ravens  29–9
| Browns complete the second 0-16 season in NFL history
|-
| 
| Tie 1–1
| style="| Ravens  26–24
| style="| Browns  12–9 (OT)
| Ravens  30–10
| Game in Baltimore is first meeting between Baker Mayfield and Lamar Jackson.  Ravens clinch division title with win in final game of the season. 
|-
| 
| Tie 1–1
| style="| Browns  40–25
| style="| Ravens  31–15
| Ravens  31–11
| 
|-

|-
| 
| style="| Ravens 2–0
| style="| Ravens  38–6
| style="| Ravens  47–42 
| Ravens  33–11
| Teams combine for an NFL record nine rushing touchdowns in the game in Cleveland, which was also the highest scoring in the history of the rivalry (89 points).
|-
| 
| Tie 1–1
| style="| Ravens  16–10
| style="| Browns  24–22
| Ravens  34–12
| 
|-
| 
| Tie 1-1
| style="| Ravens  23–20
| style="| Browns  13–3
| Ravens  35–13
|
|- 

|-
| Regular Season
| style="|Ravens 35–13
| Ravens 19–5
| Ravens 16–8
| 
|-

See also
 National Football League rivalries
 Cleveland Browns relocation controversy

References

Further reading

External links
 Ravens vs. Browns series game results

National Football League rivalries
Ravens rivalry
Browns rivalry
1999 establishments in the United States
Baltimore Ravens rivalries
Cleveland Browns rivalries